The Bellingham Blazers were an American junior ice hockey team from Bellingham, Washington, during the regular season and Langley, British Columbia, during their 1970s playoff runs. They were members of the British Columbia Junior Hockey League.

History
In 1975, the Blazers, playing out of Langley, British Columbia, won their first of two BCJHL championships.  After defeating the Kelowna Buckaroos 4-games-to-2 to win the Nat Bailey Cup, the Blazers moved on to the British Columbia Jr. A Championship, the Mowat Cup, against the Coquitlam Comets of the Pacific Junior A Hockey League.  The Blazers swept the PJHL champion 2-games-to-none.  In the Alberta/British Columbia Championship, the Blazers fell to the Alberta Junior Hockey League's Spruce Grove Mets 4-games-to-2.  After winning their two home games in Langley to start the series, the Blazers were beaten in Spruce Grove in four consecutive games to end their season.

For 1975–76, the Blazers relocated to Maple Ridge, British Columbia.  They returned to Bellingham in the summer of 1976, but the league placed an expansion team known as the Maple Ridge Bruins for 1976–77 to replace the Blazers.

In 1979, the Blazers won the league title four-games-to-none over the Kamloops Rockets, but the Canadian Amateur Hockey Association banned them from proceeding into the national playdowns as they were playing their home games in the United States.

Season-by-season record
Note: GP = Games Played, W = Wins, L = Losses, T = Ties, OTL = Overtime Losses, GF = Goals for, GA = Goals against

NHL alumni

External links 
BCHL Website
Vernon Jr. 'A'/BCHL Hockey History

Defunct British Columbia Hockey League teams
Ice hockey teams in Washington (state)
Bellingham, Washington